Lenox Crater is a cinder cone located in the San Francisco Volcanic Field in Coconino County, near Flagstaff, Arizona, an area known for volcanic activity. The volcano erupted approximately 1,000 years ago, filling a small depression with ash and volcanic cinders. The lava flow from the eruption flowed near the base of Sunset Crater.

References 

Volcanoes of Arizona
Dormant volcanoes